Devils Tower comprises two small and rugged granite islands, with a combined area of , in south-eastern Australia.  It is part of Tasmania’s Curtis Group, lying in northern Bass Strait between the Furneaux Group and Wilsons Promontory in Victoria.  It is a nature reserve.

The island was sighted and named by Lieutenant James Grant on 9 December 1800 from the survey brig HMS Lady Nelson.

Fauna
Recorded breeding seabird species include short-tailed shearwater, fairy prion and common diving-petrel.  The metallic skink is present. The island is also used as a regular haul-out site for Australian fur seals.

See also
The other islands in the Curtis Group:
 Cone Islet
 Curtis Island
 Sugarloaf Rock

References

Islands of Tasmania
Protected areas of Tasmania